Arcovomer is a genus of frogs in the family Microhylidae. It is monotypic, being represented by the single species Arcovomer passarellii, commonly known as Passarelli's frog. It is endemic to south-eastern Brazil and found in Espírito Santo, Rio de Janeiro, and São Paulo states. Frogs from Espírito Santo may represent another, undescribed species. The name honours Antonio Passarelli who collected the holotype.

Description and behaviour 
Arcovomer passarellii is a small, slender-bodied frog. Its body is brown above with a distinct irregular dark pattern running the whole length of the animal.

Male frogs call after sunset. The advertisement call is a sharp, short whistle. When disturbed, these frogs may jump and then assume a stiff-leg posture, possibly as a means to avoid detection by predators relying on their sight.

Habitat and conservation 
This species inhabits lowland primary and secondary forests. It is a ground-dwelling frog that breeds in temporary pools. Although it is a common species, it is declining in abundance, probably because of habitat loss.

References 

Microhylidae
Taxa named by Antenor Leitão de Carvalho
Amphibians described in 1954
Endemic fauna of Brazil
Amphibians of Brazil
Taxonomy articles created by Polbot
Monotypic amphibian genera